The Wallaceburg Thunderhawks are a Canadian Junior ice hockey club based in Wallaceburg, Ontario.  They play in the Provincial Junior Hockey League of the Ontario Hockey Association.

History

The Wallaceburg Thunderhawks have made the All-Ontario Final once since 1972, in 1999 they lost the Clarence Schmalz Cup to the Glanbrook Rangers. From the 1997-98 season to the 2000-2001 season the Lakers made it to the Great Lakes Junior C Finals. Winning the League Championship in 1998-99 season. The Lakers Revamped themselves in the 2006-2007 season, with Head Coach Mark Davis returning to the club, as they knocked off the 4th seeded Dresden Jr. Kings in a 6 game series for their first series win in 5 years, They would lose in the League Semi Finals to the League Champion Essex 73's in a hard fought 5 game series. In 2007-2008 The Lakers won the north division title and breezed past the Blenheim Blades in the first round 4-0. Round 2 brought on the Mooretown Flags which also brought a 4 game sweep. The Lakers would then face their rivals from Essex the 3 time defending League champions. The Lakers battled their hearts out right to the end but were no match for the 73's as Essex swept the finals in 4 games and claimed their 4th straight League Title.

On December 28, 2008, tragedy struck the Wallaceburg Lakers organization as they lost a valuable member of their team. 19-year-old Tristan Carswell (Forward, #16) died suddenly in his sleep. In the first game the Wallaceburg Lakers played following the death of Carswell, the Lakers coach asked in a pre-game speech for Tristan to send down a message to let them know he's still with them. The Lakers proceeded to score a goal 16 seconds into the game, and then again with 16 seconds remaining in the game. His jersey was retired at a ceremony February 4, 2009 in a game against Dresden.

During a tumultuous off-season in 2019, the ownership group of the Lakers dubiously applied to the Ontario Hockey Association for relocation to Tilbury, Ontario.  The move was rejected by the OHA.

Season-by-season record

2019–20 Team Staff

President of Hockey Operations - Darryl Lucio 
General Manager - Ken Shine
Head coach - Ken Shine
Assistant coach - Louie Blackbird
Assistant coach - Bob McNear
Equipment Manager -  Norm O'Dell
Trainer - Jen Gordon

Clarence Schmalz Cup appearances
1999: Glanbrook Rangers defeated Wallaceburg Lakers 4-games-to-none

References

External links
ThunderHawks Web Page
Lakers' Sarnia Sports Page

Great Lakes Junior C Hockey League teams